Young House may refer to:

Places in the United States
(by state then city)
W. H. Young House, Arkadelphia, Arkansas, listed on the National Register of Historic Places (NRHP)
Col. Young House, Bentonville, Arkansas, NRHP-listed
Young House (North Little Rock, Arkansas), once listed on the NRHP in Pulaski County, Arkansas
William Young House, Rockland, Delaware, NRHP-listed
Joseph Wesley Young House, Hollywood, Florida, NRHP-listed
Samuel and Ann Young House, Post Falls, Idaho, listed on the NRHP in Kootenai County, Idaho
Joshua P. Young House, Blue Island, Illinois, listed on the NRHP in Cook County, Illinois
Martin Young House, Chesterton, Indiana, NRHP-listed
John Young House (Geetingsville, Indiana), NRHP-listed
John W. Young Round Barn, Traer, Iowa, listed on the NRHP in Tama County, Iowa
Alexander Young Cabin, Washington, Iowa, NRHP-listed
Young's Ferry House, Bowling Green, Kentucky, listed on the NRHP in Warren County, Kentucky
Young House (Nicholasville, Kentucky), NRHP-listed
A.M. Young House, Nicholasville, Kentucky, listed on the NRHP in Jessamine County, Kentucky
Whitney Young Birthplace and Museum, Simpsonville, Kentucky, NRHP-listed
Asa E. Young House, Tracy, Kentucky, listed on the NRHP in Barren County, Kentucky
James Young House and Inn, West Point, Kentucky, listed on the NRHP in Hardin County, Kentucky
Daniel Young House, Lubec, Maine, NRHP-listed
Young-Sartorius House, Pocomoke City, Maryland, NRHP-listed
Belmont Club/John Young House, Fall River, Massachusetts, NRHP-listed
Lawrence Andrew Young Cottage, Mackinac Island, Michigan, NRHP-listed
Young House (Canton, Mississippi), listed on the NRHP in Madison County, Mississippi
George Wright Young House, Oxford, Mississippi, NRHP-listed
Young-Bradfield House, Vicksburg, Mississippi, listed on the NRHP in Warren County, Mississippi
W. A. Young House, Salem, Missouri, listed on the NRHP in Dent County, Missouri
Young-Almas House, Havre, Montana, NRHP-listed
Benjamin Young House (Stevensville, Montana), NRHP-listed
Gen. Mason J. Young House, Londonderry, New Hampshire, NRHP-listed
Brigham J. Young House, Red River, New Mexico, listed on the NRHP in Taos County, New Mexico
Isaac Young House, Ossining, New York, NRHP-listed
Young-Leach Cobblestone Farmhouse and Barn Complex, Torrey, New York, NRHP-listed
Carson-Young House, Marion, North Carolina, NRHP-listed
Dr. Lawrence Branch Young House, Rolesville, North Carolina, NRHP-listed
Thomas F. Young House, Hiram, Ohio, listed on the NRHP in Portage County, Ohio
Benjamin and Mary Young House, Mentor, Ohio, listed on the NRHP in Lake County, Ohio
Young-Shaw House, Sarahsville, Ohio, NRHP-listed
Capt. Young House, Vermilion, Ohio, listed on the NRHP in Erie County, Ohio
Colonel Charles Young House, Wilberforce, Ohio, a National Historic Landmark and NRHP-listed
Andrew Young House, Astoria, Oregon, NRHP-listed
Benjamin Young House and Carriage House, Astoria, Oregon, listed on the NRHP in Clatsop County, Oregon
John Quincy Adams and Elizabeth Young House, Cedar Mill, OR, NRHP-listed
John Eben Young House, Portland, Oregon, NRHP-listed
Robert Young House, Coatesville, Pennsylvania, NRHP-listed
Joseph Young House, Newlin Township, Pennsylvania, NRHP-listed
Virginia Durant Young House, Fairfax, South Carolina, NRHP-listed
Edna and Ernest Young Ranch, Custer, South Dakota, listed on the NRHP in Custer County, South Dakota
Wilson-Young House, Dellrose, Tennessee, NRHP-listed
Stilley-Young House, Jefferson, Texas, listed on the NRHP in Marion County, Texas
William Friend Young House, Pleasant Grove, Utah, NRHP-listed
Brigham Young Winter Home and Office, St. George, Utah, NRHP-listed
H. K. Young House, Williamsburg, Virginia, NRHP-listed
Reinhart-Young House, Olympia, Washington, listed on the NRHP in Thurston County, Washington
Fred and Elizabeth Young House, Yakima, Washington, listed on the NRHP in Yakima County, Washington
Young-Noyes House, Charleston, West Virginia, NRHP-listed
John Young House (Muscoda, Wisconsin), listed on the NRHP in Grant County, Wisconsin

Publishing house
Young House (imprint), a publishing imprint of Brigham Young University Press in the 1970s

See also
Benjamin Young House (disambiguation)
John Young House (disambiguation)
Young Farm (disambiguation)